The 2019–20 Mount St. Mary's Mountaineers men's basketball team represented Mount St. Mary's University during the 2019–20 NCAA Division I men's basketball season. The Mountaineers were led by second-year head coach Dan Engelstad, and played their home games at Knott Arena in Emmitsburg, Maryland as members of the Northeast Conference. They finished the season 11–21, 7–11 in NEC play to finish in a three-way tie for seventh place. They lost in the quarterfinals of the NEC tournament to Sacred Heart.

Previous season
The Mountaineers finished their previous season 9–22 overall, 6–12 in NEC play to finish in ninth place. They failed to qualify for the NEC tournament.

Roster

Schedule and results

|-
!colspan=12 style=| Non-Conference Regular season

|-
!colspan=12 style=| NEC regular season

|-
!colspan=12 style=| NEC tournament
|-

Source

References

Mount St. Mary's Mountaineers men's basketball seasons
Mount St. Mary's Mountaineers
Mount St. Mary's Mountaineers men's basketball team
Mount St. Mary's Mountaineers men's basketball team